= Victorian Railways dining cars =

Dining services of Victorian Railways

This article is intended as a catalogue of dining and refreshment services and carriages used by the Victorian Railways and successors.

== S type carriages ==
=== XPT ===
XBR/XFR

=== Preservation ===
- Buffet modules fitted to 80ABW, 5ABE
